I ♥ You, Pare! (International title: I ♥ You, Bro / read as I Heart You, Pare! / ) is a 2011 Philippine television drama romantic comedy series broadcast by GMA Network. Directed by Andoy Ranay and Joyce E. Bernal, it stars Regine Velasquez and Dingdong Dantes. It premiered on February 7, 2011, on the network's Telebabad line up replacing Beauty Queen. The series concluded on May 27, 2011, with a total of 78 episodes. It was replaced by Amaya in its timeslot.

The series was released on DVD by GMA Records.

Cast and characters

Lead cast
 Regine Velasquez-Alcasid as Antonia "Tonya" Estrella / Tonette
 Dingdong Dantes as Kenneth Castillo
 Iza Calzado as Antonia "Tonya" Estrella / Tonette

Supporting cast
 Tirso Cruz III as Cesar / Sarsi
 Ian Veneracion as Ramon Castillo
 Celia Rodriguez as Marita Castillo
 Luane Dy as Nikki Romualdez
 Ehra Madrigal as Mandy
 Paolo Ballesteros as Vodka
 Via Antonio as Polly
 Joel Camacho as Pepsi
 Boy Alano as Coka
 Joey Paras as Serbeza
 Peter Serrano as Vi
 Marc Abaya as Joel
 Antonio Aquitania as Sonny Boy
 Carlo Gonzales as Caloy
 Kevin Santos as Joni
 Butz Aquino as Henry Castillo
 Racquel Villavicencio as Corazon Romualdez
 Luz Valdez as Charito Castillo

Guest cast
 Ryza Cenon as Mia Valencia
 Stella Cañete as a doctor
 Tom Olivar as Costales
 Chinggoy Alonzo as Carlos Romualdez
 Arthur Solinap as Chong
 Mark Anthony Fernandez as Chito Salazar

Ratings
According to AGB Nielsen Philippines' Mega Manila People/Individual television ratings, the pilot episode of I Heart You, Pare! earned an 11.4% rating. While the final episode scored a 22.9% rating in Mega Manila household television ratings.

References

External links
 

2011 Philippine television series debuts
2011 Philippine television series endings
Filipino-language television shows
GMA Network drama series
Philippine romantic comedy television series
Television shows set in the Philippines